Kalluvathukkal is a village in the Kollam district of the Indian state of Kerala. NH 47 passes through the village. Kalluvathukkal panchayat has its own school for classes from the 5th to 10th standard. A small stadium is located next to the school. The nearest town is Chathannoor. The place is infamous for the Kalluvathukkal hooch tragedy, which took place on 21 October 2000 and killed 31 people.

Geography

Kalluvathukkal is located in the southern part of Kollam district, approximately 49 km north of the state capital, Thiruvananthapuram.

Demographics

According to the 2011 Census of India, Kalluvathukkal's population is 21,555 people, including 10,065 males and 11,490 females.

Transport

Paravur railway station is the nearest railway station, 13 km away. 10 pairs of express trains stop at Paravur. Kollam Railway Station is 22 kilometers from the village. Chathannoor KSRTC depot is located 5 kilometers from Kalluvathukkal

The nearest airport is Trivandrum International Airport, approximately 44 kilometers south on  National Highway 66.

NH 66 passes through the center of the village. Kalluvathukkal is well-connected to the main cities in the state and major towns in the district, including Trivandrum, Alappuzha, Kochi, Calicut, Kottarakara, Paravur, Kollam|Paravur, by National Highway 66 (India)|NH 66 and other state PWD roads.

Notable people

 Elamkulam Kunjan Pillai
 Anwar Rasheed

References

Villages in Kollam district